Harry Jonathan Park (December 24, 1868 – October 17, 1927) was an American businessman and politician.

Born in the town of Trimbelle, Pierce County, Wisconsin, Park moved to Cambridge, Massachusetts with family in 1872. In 1885, Park and his family moved back to Pierce County, Wisconsin. His father started an veneer mill in the  town of Trenton in Pierce County. He operated an venner mill near Brasington, Wisconsin and a mill in Elmwood, Wisconsin. In 1898, Park moved to Spring Valley, Wisconsin. He was in the real estate, funeral and furniture business. Park served as village clerk and village president for Spring Valley, Wisconsin. He also served on the school board. Park served on the Pierce County, Wisconsin Board of Supervisors and was chairman of the county board. In 1901, Park served in the Wisconsin State Assembly as a Republican. Park died of pneumonia at his home in Spring Valley, Wisconsin.

References

1868 births
1927 deaths
Politicians from Cambridge, Massachusetts
People from Pierce County, Wisconsin
Businesspeople from Wisconsin
Mayors of places in Wisconsin
County supervisors in Wisconsin
School board members in Wisconsin
Deaths from pneumonia in Wisconsin
People from Spring Valley, Wisconsin
Republican Party members of the Wisconsin State Assembly